Flint-Goodridge Hospital was a hospital that was for many years located at 2425 Louisiana Avenue, next to LaSalle Street, in uptown New Orleans, Louisiana, US.  For almost a century (1896–1983) it served predominantly African-American patients and, for most of these years, was owned and operated by Dillard University, a historically black university.

History

Early years (1896–1928)

The history of the hospital can be traced to the Phyllis Wheatley Sanitarium and Training School for Negro Nurses, run by the Phyllis Wheatley Club.  The training school included hospital care and was founded in 1896, operating under the administration of the Phyllis Wheatley Club and located in the Medical College facility of New Orleans University, which was run by the Methodist Episcopal Church.  Needing increased financing to maintain the hospital and because of a lack of financial support, the school was taken under the wing of New Orleans University and merged with the school's Medical College hospital.  The efforts of Methodist Episcopal Church Bishop Willard Francis Mallalieu, the school was able to enlist the aid of John Flint of Fall River, Massachusetts, who donated $25,000 to the institution.  In 1901, the name of the hospital was changed to Sarah Goodridge Hospital and Nurse Training School and the medical college to the name Flint Medical College of New Orleans University in honor of John Flint.  Flint donated an additional $10,000 to purchase a new property at 1566 Canal Street, which would house the Flint Medical College.

The Flint Medical College closed in 1911, when the American Medical Association, under increasingly stringent guidelines, deemed its facilities unacceptable. The school closed after being given a scathing evaluation by the Flexner Report that the Negro school "was in no position to make any contribution of value" but recommended Howard and Meharry medical school remain open. In 1915 the School of Pharmacy closed.  That year all of the buildings were placed under the use of the Sarah Goodridge Hospital, which continued to operate under the administration of the Methodist Episcopal Church and in 1916 a renovation was done on the facilities, which had fallen into disrepair.   The buildings at Canal and Robertson streets, which had been used by both the Flint Medical College and the Sarah Goodridge Hospital and Nurses Training School, were converted into a 50-bed hospital and a nurse' residence.  The hospital was renamed Flint-Goodridge Hospital.  The Nurse Training Department was reorganized and continued under the management of New Orleans University.

Dillard University governance (1929–1983)
In 1930 New Orleans University and Straight College merged to form Dillard University, a historically black university, which would own and operate the hospital henceforth.  A campaign was initiated to raise $2,000,000 for a completely new facility for the hospital.  After funds were secured, the new facility was erected in Uptown New Orleans at 2425 Louisiana Avenue, next to LaSalle Street. On February 1, 1932, the dedication ceremony was held.

Under the directorship of Albert Walter Dent
The board of trustees at Dillard, under the leadership of New Orleans businessperson and philanthropist Edgar B. Stern Sr, needed a dynamic and capable leader to serve as the superintendent of the hospital, so in 1929 they selected the twenty seven year old Morehouse alumnus from Atlanta, Albert Walter Dent.  Dent had to find a way to help his staff in complete residency, which had been a challenge due to the lack of opportunities for African American doctors during segregation.  He enlisted the aid of white doctors from Tulane and Louisiana State University to serve as consultants to the hospitals' various departments, conducting regular post-graduate seminars.  Such actions were praised as models of black and white cooperation.  Construction began on a new hospital facility designed by Dillard University architect Moise Goldsteinat at a cost of approximately one-half million dollars, which opened in 1932 at the address of 2425 Louisiana Avenue next to Howard Street and LaSalle.

During Dent's tenure the postgraduate course for physicians in the South was established.  Dent expanded the number of hospital beds allotted to free care from twenty percent to fifty percent and reduced expenses, while taking advantage of New Deal programs such as the National Youth Administration, which provided training for nurses and orderlies.  Because such programs were funded by the Federal government, it allowed the hospital to use money that would have gone into those expenses towards patient care and services, such as maternity care.  Dent convinced the board to offer a flat rate of ten dollars for maternity expenses.  In addition to increasing services for the indigent, he attempted to increase the number of paying patients, by offering a once cent pay-a-day plan, underwritten by a Rosenwald Fund donation.  In 1941 Dent was asked by Dillard University's board of trustees to leave his post at the hospital in order to become the university's third president.  He served in that position for the next twenty eight years.  His two successors as superintendent at the hospital were John L. Procope and Dr. S Tanner, however, their tenures were brief, made more troublesome with the cloud of Second World War.  During this period the hospital became burdened with debt.

Clifton Caldwell Wiell era
In 1949 Clifton Caldwell Weill, a protégé of Dent, became the superintendent and would serve in that capacity until 1970.  In 1953 a separate board from that of the university was set up for the hospital.  The previous superintendent's wife, Mrs. Albert Walker Dent, came up with a plan to hold fashion shows to raise funds for the hospital, and she contacted John H. Johnson the publisher and editor of Jet and Ebony magazines to enlist their sponsorship.  The first Ebony fashion fair for the hospital was held in 1958.  Over the years, the fair grew into a traveling event which raised funds for various causes, amongst which remained Flint Goodridge Hospital.

In 1958 Weill began a campaign to build a new addition onto the hospital.  More than 1.3 million dollars were raised, and the four-story ninety-six bed wing was completed in 1960, adding 96 beds and allowing for the expansion of the Physical Therapy Department.  The hospital was newly equipped with pipe air, room telephones, and a nurse-patient intercom system.  An intensive care unit was built in 1963 and a coronary unit was added in 1968, which featured the latest cardiac devices such as heart monitors, defibrillators, and pacemakers.  Also in 1968, a nurses' residence was built near to the hospital on Louisiana Ave. and Saratoga St.  In 1970 Weill completed his twenty-first and final year as superintendent.

Decline

As a result of desegregation measures of the 1960s, Flint Goodridge experienced a decline in patients, which would bring about its eventual closure.  Investment banker Keith Butler waged an effort to sell the hospital to a group of African American physicians, but failed.  In 1983 the hospital was sold to National Medical Enterprises, however, they opted not to use the facility as a hospital—Flint-Goodrige shut its doors.  The building that once housed the hospital still stands today at 2425 Louisiana Avenue and is now the Flint-Goodridge Apartments.

Legacy
For much of the twentieth century Flint Goodridge functioned as an African American-owned hospital serving the needs of the black community in New Orleans.  Many prominent black physicians spent all or parts of their careers working at Flint-Goodridge.

References

African-American history of Louisiana
Buildings and structures in New Orleans
Defunct hospitals in Louisiana
Historically black hospitals in the United States